Thomas Cornell may refer to:
 Thomas Cornell (settler) (1595–?), English settler in Boston, Massachusetts
 Thomas Cornell (politician) (1814–1890), American politician and businessman
 Thomas Cornell (publisher) (fl. 1780–1792), British publisher and printseller
 Thomas Cornell (artist) (1937–2012), American artist